Colutea arborescens is a species of leguminous shrub known by the common name bladder-senna. It is native to Europe and North Africa, but it is known on other continents where it is grown as an ornamental and used in landscaping for erosion control. It is also known in the wild as an occasionally weedy escapee from cultivation.

Description 
It is a vigorous shrub to 3 m, takes a rounded form and has many branches covered in deciduous leaves. The leaves are pale green and made up of many pairs of slightly hairy oval-shaped leaflets, each up to about 3 cm long. The inflorescence is a raceme of generally pea-like yellow flowers about 3 cm long. The fruit is an inflated bladdery pod which dries to a papery texture. It is 2 to 3 cm long and contains many seeds.

Cultivation 
It will grow in poor dry soil in exposed conditions, but likes full sun. It propagates by seed or softwood cuttings.

References

External links
 USDA Plants Profile
 Jepson Manual Treatment
 
 
 

Galegeae
Plants described in 1753
Taxa named by Carl Linnaeus
Flora of Europe